In January 1930, the U.S. state of New York implemented a major renumbering of its state highways. Many previously existing numbered routes were renumbered or realigned. At the same time, many state highways that were previously unnumbered received designations. Most of the highways with numbers in the 100s to 300s were assigned at this time.  Route numbers were assigned in clusters based on their general location.  Because some of these route numbers are no longer in use, the pattern of clusters is not fully apparent today.

Before 1930, the route numbering system in place had its origins in the 1920s. At the time, New York only assigned numbers to a small subset of its state highways.  Route numbers spanned from 1–80, with routes running primarily north–south having even numbers and routes generally running east–west having odd numbers. This scheme was abandoned with the advent of the U.S. Highway System in 1927. Some renumbering was done in 1927 to avoid overlapping route numbers.

Pre-renumbering routes
The table below lists the routes in existence just prior to the 1930 renumbering and the effects of the renumbering on these routes.

Post-renumbering routes
The table below lists the routes in existence immediately following the renumbering, including those established as part of the renumbering. An asterisk (*) in the "Pre-1930 designations" column indicates a segment of highway that was previously unnumbered. If the cell in the "Pre-1930 designations" column is empty, then the entirety of the highway was previously unnumbered.

Routes 1–99

Routes 100–199

Routes 200–299

Routes 300–399

Routes 400 and up

Notes

References

 The map was drawn post-renumbering.
 The map was drawn post-renumbering.
Automobile Legal Association (ALA) Automobile Green Book, 1930/31 and 1931/32 editions, (Scarborough Motor Guide Co., Boston, 1930 and 1931). The 1930/31 edition shows New York state routes prior to the 1930 renumbering

 Renumbering 1930
State Highway Renumbering (New York), 1930
State Highway Renumbering (New York), 1930
History of New York (state)
Highway renumbering in the United States